East Southbourne and Tuckton is a ward in Bournemouth, Dorset. Since 2019, the ward has elected 2 councillors to Bournemouth, Christchurch and Poole Council.

History 
The ward formerly elected 3 councillors to Bournemouth Borough Council.

Geography 
The ward covers the eastern areas of Southbourne, and the suburb of Tuckton - stretching eastward to Warren Hill and Hengistbury Head.

Councillors 

 Basil Thorpe Ratcliffe - Conservative (1991 to 2011)

Election results

References

External links 

 Ward profile from Bournemouth Borough Council
 Listed Buildings in the ward

Wards of Bournemouth, Christchurch and Poole